The Hoberman Arch was the centerpiece of the Olympic Medals Plaza in downtown Salt Lake City during the 2002 Winter Olympics. Following the Olympics the arch was moved to the Salt Lake 2002 Olympic Cauldron Park where, along with the Olympic cauldron, it was one of the main highlights and an important part of Salt Lake's Olympic legacy. In August 2014, the arch was removed from the park and a new public display location has not yet been found.

Design and history
The arch was designed by Chuck Hoberman to be used as a mechanical curtain for the Olympic Medal Plaza's stage. It is a semi-circular aluminum structure, which opened like the iris of a human eye. The arch design was inspired by Utah's natural stone arches, such as Delicate Arch. At the time of its construction the arch was the largest unfolding structure in the world.

It took Hoberman four months to design the arch (with support from Buro Happold). Specialized knuckle assemblies, which allowed the arch to expand and contract, were fabricated by Hudson Machine Works in Brewster, NY.  These were paired with the arch's structural components and pieced together in its entirety by Scenic Technologies of New Windsor, New York,   who spent an additional four months in constructing the arch in their warehouse in New York. It was then disassembled and then trucked to Utah, being reassembled in January 2002, and unveiled to the public and media by the Salt Lake Organizing Committee (SLOC), on January 25, 2002.

When installed at the medal plaza it would open to reveal a large 3D sculpture of the 2002 Olympic logo and a second Olympic cauldron, known as the Hero's Cauldron. The stage not only hosted award ceremonies, where the athletes received their medals, but was used as a concert venue during the Olympics; hosting many performing artists including Creed, Brooks & Dunn and the Dave Matthews Band.

Following the Olympics, plans to install the arch in some kind of park were formulated. Many of Salt Lake's citizens wanted the arch to be used in an amphitheater or some kind of concert venue, possibly at downtown's Gallivan Center or Pioneer Park. But because the arch was a symbol of the 2002 games, the United States Olympic Committee put restrictions on possible future locations for the arch (to protect Olympic sponsors from other businesses who do not have Olympic sponsor contracts). Because of these restrictions, and a lack of consensus among Salt Lake's leaders on where it would go, SLOC announced plans, on December 5, 2002, to install the arch at the Salt Lake 2002 Olympic Cauldron Park.  

On July 30, 2003, the arch was lifted onto its new base at the park using 3 cranes. The arch was located just outside the park's southern fence and was partly open which allowed visitors to walk through it, while at night the arch was lit with multicolored lights. The arch was removed from the park in August 2014. On December 6, 2014, pieces of the arch were stolen from an impound lot where it had been stored. As of March 2018, the arch remained in storage.

Details
The panels are also translucent which allowed light from behind to be seen and echoed the 2002 Olympic theme Light the Fire Within. Two 30-horsepower motors controlled eight separate cables which pulled the mechanical curtain open in about 20 seconds. When the arch was fully opened it had folded up into a  ring, which framed the stage. It was designed to open and close like the iris of an eye. During the Olympics, it was included in the every evening medal ceremony and when opened, revealed the second Olympic cauldron.

Because of the potential of strong storms during the games, the arch was built to operate in extreme weather, including up to  -per-hour winds.

References

External links

 Salt Lake 2002 Cauldron Park website
 Hoberman Associates - Arch project page

2002 establishments in Utah
2002 sculptures
2002 Winter Olympics
Aluminum sculptures in Utah
Buildings and structures in Salt Lake City
Outdoor sculptures in Utah
Tourist attractions in Salt Lake City